Crumlin GAA Club is a Gaelic Athletic Association club in Crumlin, Dublin, Ireland.

Origins of the game in Crumlin
As far back as the 1740s  Hurling was to be seen in Crumlin. The village was bordered by an area of "Common Land". The most important game recorded at Crumlin Common was in 1748, between hurlers representing Leinster and Munster, a game which Leinster won by a late goal.

Club history
Crumlin Independents were set up in the early 1900s and lasted until 1935. St. Agnes’s Football Club was set up in 1932, to be followed by St. Columba’s Hurling Club in 1945. These two clubs catered for their respective games until the end of 1969, when they amalgamated to form Crumlin Hurling and Football Club. In late 1979 a new addition to the club took place when it was joined by Cúchulainn Camogie Club, which had operated in the area since 1967. In 2007 the Club was renamed Crumlin GAA Club.

Facilities
Club playing pitches are located in Willie Pearse Park in Crumlin Village, and the clubhouse, which was opened in 1983 is located at Lorcan O'Toole Park.

Camogie
Crumlin camogie club won the All-Ireland Senior Club Camogie Championship in 1985, defeating Athenry by 4-8 to 3-2 in the final. . The club was founded in 1966 by Phil Barry, Nuala Dunphy and Jeanne Quigley, and was originally known as the Cuchulainns Club. In 1980, the club joined up with the local Crumlin GAA club and, for some time, were known as Crumlin Cuchulainn. They club drew heavily on the players of the successful Assumption, Walkinstown, winners of Leinster post-primary schools titles.

Honours
 Dublin Senior Hurling Championship Winners 1978 and 1979
 Leinster Senior Club Hurling Championship Winners 1979
 Dublin Minor Football Championship Winners 1976
 Dublin Minor Hurling Championship Winners 1976
 Dublin Under 21 Hurling Championship Winners 1986, 1987
 All Ireland Senior Club Camogie Championship Winners 1985
 Dublin Junior Football Championship Winners 2006
 Dublin Junior Hurling Championship Winners 2006 and 2007
 Leinster League Division 2 Hurling Championship Winners 2011

Crumlin where the only Dublin team to win the Leinster Senior Club Hurling Championship until Cuala in 2016

Current teams
In terms of Adult games, Crumlin currently have three Hurling teams (Senior, Intermediate and Junior),two Football Teams (Intermediate and Junior,)an Intermediate Camogie team, and a newly formed Ladies Football team. In addition, the club has a thriving juvenile section, with children from 8 year upwards playing Hurling, Football and Camogie.

Notable members
 Brian McMahon from Crumlin was, in 1990, the last Dublin hurler to get an All Star award until Alan McCrabbe was awarded an All Star in 2009.
 In 2007 former Dublin Hurling Manager, the late Jimmy Boggan, was awarded the inaugural Dublin Hurling Hall of Fame Award for a lifetime contribution to Dublin Hurling.
 Pat Ryan was a member of the  football team that defeated Galway in the 1983 All-Ireland Senior Football Championship Final.

References

External links
 
Official Dublin GAA Website
Dublin Club GAA

Gaelic games clubs in Dublin (city)
Gaelic football clubs in Dublin (city)
Hurling clubs in Dublin (city)
Crumlin, Dublin